Kathleen is an unincorporated community in Houston County, Georgia, United States. It is part of the Warner Robins, Georgia Metropolitan Statistical Area.
It is home to roughly 11,500 people.

Education 
Houston County Board of Education (Georgia) operates public schools.

Elementary school
Matthew C Arthur Elementary School

Also served by:
Bonaire Elementary School
Kings Chapel Elementary School
Langston Road Elementary School
David A Purdue Primary/Elementary
Hilltop Elementary School

Middle school
 Mossy Creek Middle School
 Veterans Middle School (TBA)

Also served by:
 Bonaire Middle School
 Perry Middle School

High school
 Veterans High School

Also served by:
 
 Perry High School 
 Houston County High School

See also
Log Dogtrot House, near Kathleen, a National Register of Historic Places-listed site

References

Unincorporated communities in Houston County, Georgia
Unincorporated communities in Georgia (U.S. state)